Caritas Europa is a European confederation of Catholic relief organization, development and social service organisations operating in Europe, founded in 1971 as Eurocaritas. The organisation was renamed Caritas Europa in 1992 and is one of the seven regions of Caritas Internationalis. The organisation's secretariat is in Brussels, Belgium.

Caritas Europa consists of 49 national member organisations that are working in 46 European countries. The member organisations are active in combating poverty and social exclusion, providing social and welfare services, dealing with migration and asylum issues, combating human trafficking, providing humanitarian aid in Europe and across the world, regional development, peace programs and projects around the world. Caritas Europa fosters cooperation and mutual learning among its member organisations and facilitates capacity building, joint advocacy and joint projects and programs.

Secretaries General
 1983-1991: Walter E. Laetsch
 1985-1992: Edward de Brandt (Managing Director of Euro-Caritas)
 1991-1995: Luc Trouillard
 1996-2002: Hermann Icking
 2002-2010: Marius Wanders
 2010-2019: Jorge Nuño Mayer
 2019-?: Maria Nyman

Notes
 Caritas Europa. Moved With Compassion - The History of Caritas Europa - Festschrift on the Occasion of the 25th Anniversary of Caritas Europa's Statutes 1993-2018. Publisher: Jorge Nuño Mayer.

External links
 Caritas Europa

Organizations established in 1971
Caritas Internationalis
Christian organisations based in Belgium
Non-profit organizations based in Europe